Giesing (formerly Kyesinga) was a Bavarian town founded in 790 (older than Munich).
The town was incorporated by the city of Munich in October 1854. Since then, it is a borough of the metropolis.

Giesing is located south-east of Munich and has a population of 50,000 (as of 2011).

It consists of Obergiesing (part of Stadtbezirk 17 Obergiesing-Fasangarten) and Untergiesing (part of Stadtbezirk 18 Untergiesing-Harlaching). These sub-entities are divided in the Southern part by the River Isar.

Giesing was one of the first villages in the perimeter of Munich to be incorporated into the city of Munich in 1854. 

The first McDonald's restaurant in Germany was opened there in 1971.
The Military Government for Bavaria was located in the former Reichszeugmeisterei. McGraw Kaserne and the Prison Munich Stadelheim are located there. In this prison the members of the Weisse Rose (White Rose) Resistance group were killed by the Nazis and buried in the Perlacher Forest Cemetery which is the former Prison Cemetery.
Nowadays, Giesing is considered a multi-cultural district with people from various different cultural backgrounds. Its relatively moderate renting fees have made the district popular amongst students and artists.

See also
History of Munich
Timeline of Munich

References

790 establishments
History of Munich
Former municipalities in Bavaria